Three Smart Girls Grow Up is a 1939 American musical comedy film directed by Henry Koster, written by Felix Jackson and Bruce Manning, and starring Deanna Durbin, Nan Grey, and Helen Parrish. Durbin and Grey reprise their roles from Three Smart Girls, and Parrish replaces Barbara Read in the role of the middle sister. Durbin would reprise her role once more in Hers to Hold.

Plot
Three sisters believe life is going to be easy now that their parents are back together, until one sister falls in love with another's fiancé, and the youngest sister plays matchmaker.

Cast
 Deanna Durbin as Penelope 'Penny' Craig
 Nan Grey as Joan Craig
 Helen Parrish as Katherine 'Kay' Craig
 Charles Winninger as Judson Craig
 Nella Walker as Mrs. Craig
 Robert Cummings as Harry Loren
 William Lundigan as Richard Watkins
 Ernest Cossart as Binns, the butler
 Felix Bressart as a music teacher
 Charles Coleman as Henry

Production
In August 1938 Bruce Manning and Felix Jackson were reported as working on a sequel.

In September, Barbara Read, who had been in the original, was considered "a little too grown up" for the sequel and was replaced by Helen Parrish, who had been in Mad About Music with Durbin.

Filming started in November. It halted because Durbin fell ill and resumed on 23 December.

Cummings received a long-term contract from Universal after being cast in the film.

References

External links
 
 

1939 films
1939 musical comedy films
American black-and-white films
American musical comedy films
American sequel films
1930s English-language films
Films directed by Henry Koster
Films produced by Joe Pasternak
Universal Pictures films
1930s American films